This is a list of earthquakes in 1987. Only earthquakes of magnitude 6 or above are included, unless they result in damage or casualties, or are notable for some other reason.  All dates are listed according to UTC time.

By death toll

By magnitude

By month

January

February

References

Notes 

1987
1987
1987